Manuel Fernández Supervielle (23 September 1894 – May 5, 1947, Miramar, Havana, Cuba) was a Cuban politician and attorney. He obtained his law degree from the University of Havana.

He was a member of the Cuban House of Representatives as member of the Partido Demócrata Republicano. He later left the party and joined the Partido Revolucionario Cubano (Auténtico). Supervielle was the Secretary of the Treasury of Cuba during the government of Ramón Grau San Martín (1944–1946). He later became the Mayor of Havana in September 1946. He had promised to build a new aqueduct for the city, but was unable to fulfill his promise. So on May 5, 1947, he shot himself in the chest with a revolver and died. The U.S. Embassy in Havana reported: "Great weight public opinion, as openly expressed, blames Grau and administration for death, holding that honest honorable official was hampered in fulfillment waterworks campaign promises by venality of politicians and preferred death to dishonor." He was succeeded by the President of the Havana City Council, Nicolás Castellanos.

He was married to Aurelia Palacios and had a son from his first marriage, Alfredo Fernández Supervielle y Domínguez (16 May 1922 – 4 February 2008), who remained in Cuba until the communist takeover. Thereafter, he immigrated to the United States, earned his PhD at Florida State University and taught.

References and external links

Time magazine; Vote of Confidence, June 10, 1946
 web.gc.cuny.edu/bildnercenter/publications/documents/Ehrlich26_000.pdf
 Diario las Americas; Falleció Alfredo Fernández Supervielle, February 8, 2008.
 https://web.archive.org/web/20110427083227/http://www.palabranueva.net/contens/0902/000108.htm

Finance ministers of Cuba
Members of the Cuban House of Representatives
1894 births
1947 deaths
Mayors of places in Cuba
20th-century Cuban politicians
Suicides by firearm in Cuba